Elections to Cumnock and Doon Valley District Council were held on 3 May 1977, on the same day as the other Scottish local government elections. This was the second election to the district council following the local government reforms in 1974.

The election used the original 10 wards created by the Formation Electoral Arrangements in 1974. Each ward elected one councillor using first-past-the-post voting.

Despite losing two seats, Labour maintained control of the district council, winning six of the 10 seats. The 1977 local elections were the first test for the nationalist Scottish Labour Party (SLP) which had been formed as a breakaway from Labour by South Ayrshire MP Jim Sillars alongside John Robertson and Alex Neil. The SLP achieved its best results in Cumnock and Doon Valley by winning two seats from Labour and taking more than 25% of the popular vote but the party ultimately fared poorly across the country. The Conservatives remained on one seat after losing their seat in Mauchline and gaining Catrine and Sorn. This was the last time the Conservatives would win a seat in the area until the 2017 local elections, 40 years later. The remaining seat was won by an independent candidate.

Results

Source:

Ward results

Cumnock Burgh

Lugar, Logan and Muirkirk

Old Cumnock Parish

Auchinleck

Catrine and Sorn

New Cumnock

Dalmellington

Patna and Dalrymple

Drongan, Ochiltree, Rankinston and Stair

Mauchline

References

1977 Scottish local elections
1977